Inguromorpha is a genus of moths in the family Cossidae.

Species
 Inguromorpha arcifera (Dyar, 1906)
 Inguromorpha basalis Walker, 1856
 Inguromorpha buboa Schaus, 1934
 Inguromorpha itzalana (Strecker, 1900)
 Inguromorpha polybia (Schaus, 1892)
 Inguromorpha polybioides (Schaus, 1911)
 Inguromorpha roseobrunnea (Dognin, 1917)
 Inguromorpha sterila (Dognin 1910)

Former species
 Inguromorpha arbeloides Dyar, 1899

References

External links

Natural History Museum Lepidoptera generic names catalog

Hypoptinae
Cossidae genera